William Wirt Warren (February 27, 1834 – May 2, 1880) was a U.S. Representative from Massachusetts.

Biography
William W. Warren was born in Brighton (now a part of Boston), Massachusetts on February 27, 1834.  He received a classical education, and graduated from Harvard University in 1855.

He attended Harvard Law School, continued to studied law, was admitted to the bar, and commenced practice in 1857.

In 1865 he was appointed assessor of internal revenue for the seventh district of Massachusetts, responsible to ensure payment of taxes levied to support the Union Army during the American Civil War.  Warren also served on Brighton's school board and as its town clerk.  He advocated for Brighton to be annexed to Boston, which occurred in 1874.

Warren was a delegate to the 1868 Democratic National Convention.  In 1870 he served in the Massachusetts State Senate.  He ran unsuccessfully for Congress in 1872, losing to John M. S. Williams.

In 1874 Warren was elected as a Democrat to the Forty-fourth Congress (March 4, 1875 – March 3, 1877).  He was an unsuccessful candidate for reelection in 1876 to the Forty-fifth Congress, losing to William Claflin.

After leaving Congress Warren resumed practicing law Boston.

Warren died in Boston on May 2, 1880.  He was interred at Evergreen Cemetery in Boston.

See also
 1870 Massachusetts legislature

References

William Wirt Warren in Memoirs of the Judiciary and the Bar of New England for the Nineteenth Century. Volume III. 1901. Page 529. Conrad Reno, author.

1834 births
1880 deaths
Harvard University alumni
Democratic Party members of the United States House of Representatives from Massachusetts
19th-century American politicians